Edward Lee (1925 – 14 November 1988) was a Chinese basketball player. He competed in the men's tournament at the 1948 Summer Olympics.

References

External links
 

1925 births
1988 deaths
Chinese men's basketball players
Olympic basketball players of China
Basketball players at the 1948 Summer Olympics
Place of birth missing
Asian Games medalists in basketball
Asian Games silver medalists for Chinese Taipei
Basketball players at the 1954 Asian Games
Medalists at the 1954 Asian Games
Chinese expatriates in the Philippines
1954 FIBA World Championship players
Republic of China men's national basketball team players